Ulrike Mai (born 6 January 1960 in Dresden, East Germany as Ulrike Kunze) is a German television, movie, voice and theater actress. Among her native German she speaks English, French and Russian languages.

Life and career 

From 1978 to 1981, Ulrike Kunze studied at Ernst Busch Drama School in Berlin.

In 1980, she became famous in the USSR after appearing as Anna Mons in Sergei Gerasimov's movies The Youth of Peter the Great and At the Beginning of Glorious Days after Aleksey Tolstoy's Peter the Great novel.

Having succeeded her studies in Berlin, she acted in Magdeburg's theater until 1984 and then continued her performing career in Halle, Saxony-Anhalt.

In 1987, Ulrike Kunze got a job at DDR-FS (a state owned channel in East Germany).

It was the same year she married a German actor and director Jürgen Mai whose last name she took.

From 2005 to 2007, Ulrike Mai appeared as Helga Plenske in ViB series.

References

External links 
 

1960 births
Living people
Actors from Dresden
People from Bezirk Dresden
German film actresses
German television actresses
German stage actresses
German voice actresses
East German actors
East German women
20th-century German women